Bouchra Fatima Zohra Hirech (born 22 August 2000) is an Algerian weightlifter.

Career 
Hirech studied at the Mostaganem School. Aged 15, she won a bronze medal in the 75 kg division at the 2016 African Weightlifting Championships. At the 2016 Olympics she competed in the +75 kg category and placed last.

References

External links

 
 
 
 

2000 births
Living people
Olympic weightlifters of Algeria
Weightlifters at the 2016 Summer Olympics
Algerian female weightlifters
Competitors at the 2019 African Games
Place of birth missing (living people)
African Games competitors for Algeria
African Weightlifting Championships medalists
21st-century Algerian women